Berrington may refer to

Places in England
Berrington, Northumberland
Berrington, Shropshire
Berrington railway station
Berrington, Worcestershire
Berrington Green, Worcestershire
Berrington Hall, a country house near Leominster, Herefordshire
Berrington and Eye railway station, a former station near Berrington Hall

Ships
Berrington (ship), two merchant ships, including:
Berrington (1783 EIC ship), an East Indiaman

Persons
Elizabeth Berrington (born 1970), English actress
Emily Berrington (born 1985), English actress